Kaup is a village in Garhani block of Bhojpur district, Bihar, India. As of 2011, its population was 4,958, in 740 households.

References 

Villages in Bhojpur district, India